Namwon Dokgo clan is one of the Korean clans. Their Bon-gwan is in Namwon, North Jeolla Province. According to research conducted in 2000, the number of Namwon Dokgo clan members was 452. Their founder was  who was from Henan.  was one of the Eight Scholars in Tang dynasty and was naturalized at the end of Silla. Then, Dokgo sin founded Namwon Dokgo clan and made Namwon, Namwon Dokgo clan’s Bon-gwan.

See also 
 Korean clan names of foreign origin

References

External links 
 

 
Korean clan names of Chinese origin
Dokgo clans